Ella Kaabachi (born 15 May 1992) is a footballer who plays as a forward for ASJ Soyaux. Born in France, she represents Tunisia at international level.

Early life
Kaabachi was born in Argenteuil to a Tunisian father and an Algerian mother. She has dual French nationality.

International career
Kaabachi capped for Tunisia at senior level, including a friendly on 10 June 2021, starting the match and scoring a goal against Jordan.

International goals
Scores and results list Tunisia's goal tally first

See also
List of Tunisia women's international footballers

References

External links

1992 births
Living people
Citizens of Tunisia through descent
Tunisian women's footballers
Women's association football forwards
Tunisia women's international footballers
Tunisian people of Algerian descent
Sportspeople from Argenteuil
French women's footballers
Paris Saint-Germain Féminine players
Rodez AF (women) players
GPSO 92 Issy players
French sportspeople of Tunisian descent
French sportspeople of Algerian descent
ASJ Soyaux-Charente players
Footballers from Val-d'Oise